"Over My Head (Cable Car)" (originally performed simply as "Cable Car") is a song by American rock band the Fray. It was released in October 2005 as the lead single from their debut album How to Save a Life (2005) and hit the top 10 on the Billboard Hot 100 chart. The single helped propel their album from the Top Heatseekers chart to the top 20 of The Billboard 200 chart. The CD single was backed with "Heaven Forbid" and a live version of "Hundred". In the United Kingdom, "Over My Head (Cable Car)" was released as the second single from the album, following "How to Save a Life".

The song sold over two million digital downloads in the United States and was certified 2× Platinum by the RIAA in May 2006. The song was the fifth most-downloaded single of 2006 and was ranked number 13 on the Hot 100 singles of 2006 by Billboard. It was nominated for a Grammy Award for Best Pop Performance by a Duo or Group with Vocals in 2007 but lost to "My Humps" by the Black Eyed Peas.

The song was ranked No. 43 on Billboards Best Adult Pop Songs of the Decade list and No. 100 on Billboards Top 100 Digital Tracks of the Decade list.

After comparisons were drawn between "Over My Head (Cable Car)" and the Chainsmokers' "Closer", Isaac Slade and guitarist Joe King of the Fray were credited as co-writers of "Closer" on September 2, 2016.

Song meaning
The song "Over My Head" was written about lead singer and pianist Isaac Slade's relationship with his brother, Caleb, nicknamed "Cable Car". He wrote the song because he and his brother were allegedly not speaking and were at odds with each other:

"It is about a fight I got in with my brother, Caleb. After he graduated high school, we drifted apart and really hadn't spoken in a long time. One day we both realized that we needed to fight it out. We'd been friends for 20 years. That's a long time when you're only 23 years old. We fought it out, and he's one of my best friends today."

The song was originally recorded as a demo in 2004. This demo version was picked up by Denver radio station KTCL, and became one of the station's most played songs of 2005. There is also another slightly different version of the song which is 4:10 in length.

Reception

Critical
Billboard called the tune "a timeless pop-rock smash that soars with lightness and ease." Stylus Magazine called it a "10/10, single of the year, instant classic track".

Commercial
The song became a top 40 hit on the Modern Rock Tracks chart in late 2005. It lasted three weeks on the chart and peaked at position No. 37. The single gained airplay nationally, entering the Billboard Hot 100 chart on the issue marked February 25, 2006. 14 weeks later it reached its peak position at No. 8 on the Hot 100 chart. On the Billboard Adult Top 40 chart, the single reached the No. 2 position. The single also saw airplay on some Christian radio stations and spent several weeks on the R&R Christian charts, where it peaked at No. 27.

Internationally, the song was a Top 25 hit in Australia, Canada, Denmark, Ireland, New Zealand and the United Kingdom. In the beginning of 2007, the song became popular in the Netherlands.

Music video

The music video was directed by Elliott Lester and was filmed on July 24, 2006, at East High School and at Fox Theatre in Denver and Boulder, respective. The video shows the members of the band as children, who attract the attention of other children by playing various instruments. Micah Slade, the youngest brother of Isaac Slade, assumes the role of Isaac as a child in the music video. While the video was not granted much airplay on MTV, it peaked at No. 2 in the VH1 Top 20 Countdown. It was ranked number 8 on VH1's "Top 40 Videos of 2006."

Charts

Weekly charts

Year-end charts

All-time charts

Certifications

A Day to Remember version

"Over My Head (Cable Car)" was covered by American rock band A Day to Remember and included on their EP, Attack of the Killer B-Sides. It was also previously released on the Punk Goes Pop Volume Two compilation album.

See also
 "Closer" (The Chainsmokers song) - whose melody is similar to part of this song, leading to a song-writing credit for Slade and King

References

External links
 Over My Head (Cable Car) Official Video.
 Official Lyrics to "Over My Head (Cable Car)"

2005 debut singles
2005 songs
The Fray songs
Music videos directed by Elliott Lester
Rock ballads
Songs written by Isaac Slade
Songs written by Joe King (guitarist)